Stewartia sinensis, the Chinese stewartia, is a species of flowering plant in the camellia family Theaceae, native to central and eastern China. The species also has an attractive multiple-branched growth habit and low maintenance requirements.

This has led to its recommendation for use where larger trees are inadvisable, e.g. under power lines. When not grown in forested settings, S. sinensis generally takes the form of a multiply-branched, large shrub.

Preferred growing conditions for S. sinensis are similar to those of the more commonly cultivated and closely related Japanese stewartia (S. pseudocamellia), though the latter is somewhat more cold-tolerant. Stewartia sinensis prefers full sun to part shade and moist, well-drained slightly acid soil in a protected location, but may be grown as a specimen tree in climates that do not test its cold-tolerance. It is hardy to USDA zone 5, but it has been suggested that young trees may be more susceptible to cold than older specimens, and should thus be protected during very cold temperatures until they reach mature sizes.

In the UK Stewartia sinensis has gained the Royal Horticultural Society’s Award of Garden Merit.

References

Flora of China
sinensis